Shady Grove is an unincorporated community in White County, Tennessee, United States.

References

Unincorporated communities in White County, Tennessee
Unincorporated communities in Tennessee